Patrick Bailey (born May 29, 1999) is an American professional baseball catcher in the San Francisco Giants organization. He played college baseball at North Carolina State University. Bailey was selected 13th overall by the Giants in the first round of the 2020 Major League Baseball draft.

Amateur career
Bailey attended Wesleyan Christian Academy in High Point, North Carolina, where he played baseball. In 2016, he was selected for the U-18 United States national baseball team. In 2017, his senior year, he batted .510 with five home runs and 33 RBIs. He was drafted by the Minnesota Twins in the 37th round of the 2017 Major League Baseball draft, but did not sign and instead chose to fulfill his commitment to play college baseball at North Carolina State University.

In 2018, Bailey's freshman year at NC State, he slashed .321/.419/.604(4th in the ACC) with 13 home runs (a NC State freshman record) and forty RBIs, earning ACC Freshman of the Year honors alongside being named a Freshman-All American and to the All-ACC Second Team. After the 2018 season, he played collegiate summer baseball with the Yarmouth–Dennis Red Sox of the Cape Cod Baseball League. He was also selected for the United States collegiate national team.  As a sophomore in 2019, Bailey batted .288/.390/.513 with three triples (8th in the ACC) and ten home runs alongside a .989 fielding percentage. That summer, he played for the United States collegiate national team again. As a junior in 2020, he hit .296/.466/.685 in 54 at bats with six home runs (4th in the ACC), twenty RBIs (2nd) and 17 walks (3rd) over 17 games before the college baseball season was cut short due to the COVID-19 pandemic.

Professional career
Bailey was selected by the San Francisco Giants in the first round with the 13th overall selection of the 2020 Major League Baseball draft. He signed with the Giants for a signing bonus of $3.8 million. He did not play a minor league game in 2020 due to the cancellation of the minor league season.

Bailey made his professional debut in 2021 with the Eugene Emeralds of the High-A West. After slashing .185/.290/.296 with two home runs and 15 RBIs over 33 games, he was demoted to the Rookie-level Arizona League Giants on June 26, but was reassigned to the San Jose Giants of the Low-A West after two games. Over 47 games with San Jose to finish the season, Bailey slashed .322/.416(7th in the league)/.531 with seven home runs, 24 RBIs, and 16 doubles, and caught 48% of attempted base-stealers. He was selected to play in the Arizona Fall League for the Scottsdale Scorpions after the season where he batted .292/.375/.417 in 48 at bats, and was named to the Fall Stars Game. 

He returned to Eugene for the 2022 season.https://twitter.com/EugeneEmeralds/status/1511803909546803201/photo/1  Over 83 games, he hit .225/.342/.420 in 267 at bats with 12 home runs, 51 RBIs, and 49 walks (8th in the league), while leading the league with seven sacrifice flies and on defense catching 30% of attempted base-stealers. He was named the 2022 MiLB Gold Glove as the best defensive catcher in the minor leagues.

References

External links

NC State Wolfpack bio

1999 births
Living people
Baseball catchers
Baseball players from Greensboro, North Carolina
NC State Wolfpack baseball players
United States national baseball team players
Yarmouth–Dennis Red Sox players
Arizona Complex League Giants players
Eugene Emeralds players
San Jose Giants players
Scottsdale Scorpions players